Wittawas Basapean (born December 4, 1984), also better known as Samartlek Kokietgym, is a Thai professional boxer and a ranked Minimumweight boxer. He is a former WBC Asian Boxing Council Minimumweight Champion and current PABA Minimumweight Champion, also Basapean is a former world title challenger who fought Naoya Inoue for the WBC World Light Flyweight Title and Akira Yaegashi for the IBF World Light Flyweight Title. Basapean has also fought a number of notable lower weight division boxers such as Tanawat Phonnaku, Muhammad Rachman, Denver Cuello and Randy Petalcorin.

Basapean is set to fight the Filipino boxing Olympian Mark Barriga in October 29, 2017 for the vacant WBO International Minimumweight Title. Basapean lost a one-sided Unanimous Decision against Barriga in Beijing, China.

Professional boxing record

References

External links 
 

Living people
1984 births
Samartlek Kokietgym
Samartlek Kokietgym
Samartlek Kokietgym
Flyweight boxers